Say What You Feel is a 2005 album by Irish singer/songwriter Paul Brady, his ninth solo album.

Track listing
"Smile"  
"Don't Try to Please Me"  
"Love in a Bubble"  
"I Only Want You"  
"Living For the Corporation"  
"Say What You Feel"  
"Locked Up in Heaven"  
"Sail Sail On"  
"You That's Really You"  
"Doin't It in the Dark"  
"Beyond the Reach of Love"  
"Man I Used to Be"

Personnel
Paul Brady - vocals, acoustic guitar, bass, keyboards, Fender Rhodes, percussion, backing vocals
Tom Britt - electric guitar
Danny Thompson, Viktor Krauss, Byron House - string bass
Garry West - electric bass
Reese Wynans - Hammond organ
John R. Burr - piano, Wurlitzer
Kenny Malone - drums, percussion
Alison Brown - electric banjo
Gerry O'Beirne - ukulele
Steve Conn - accordion
Jim Hoke - saxophone
Neil Rosengarden - trumpet
Scat Springs, Andrea Zonn - backing vocals

External links
 Oh What a World on  Amazon

2005 albums
Paul Brady albums